Hormidas Jeannotte (December 22, 1843 – April 29, 1909) was a notary and political figure in Quebec. He represented L'Assomption in the House of Commons of Canada from 1892 to 1896 as a Conservative member.

He was born in St-Henri de Mascouche, Canada East. He served as a member of the municipal council for Montreal from 1878 to 1894. Jeannotte was defeated by Joseph Gauthier in the 1891 federal election but won the 1892 by-election held after the results of that election were overturned. He was defeated by Gauthier when he ran for reelection in 1896.

References 
 

1843 births
1909 deaths
Members of the House of Commons of Canada from Quebec
Conservative Party of Canada (1867–1942) MPs
People from Mascouche